Jinzha is a figure in Chinese mythology, appearing in works such as Investiture of the Gods. A disciple of the superiorman Wenshu Guangfa Tianzun, he is the eldest brother of Nezha and the elder brother of Muzha.

Character biography
Jinzha was born to General Li Jing. The eldest brother of Nezha and the elder brother of Muzha, Jinzha had been a disciple of Manjusri Bodhisattva for many years, who was previously Broad Altruist or Wenshu Guangfa Tianzun.

References

Bibliography
 

Chinese gods
Investiture of the Gods characters
Journey to the West characters